Episparis varialis is a moth of the family Erebidae first described by Francis Walker in 1859. It is found in India and Sri Lanka. The binomial name is sometimes classified as a junior objective synonym of Phalaena liturata.

References

Moths of Asia
Moths described in 1859